Julia Kathrin Marty (born 16 April 1988) is a Swiss ice hockey player, currently playing in the Women's League (SWHL A) with EV Bomo Thun. She is a former eleven-season member of the Swiss national ice hockey team and served as captain for three seasons, including in the women's ice hockey tournament at the 2014 Winter Olympics in Sochi.

Playing career
Prior to her college ice hockey career, Marty played with EV Zug in the Leistungsklasse A (LKA), the top Swiss women's league, from 2003 to 2007. She was a LKA All-Star selection in 2005 and participated in the European Champions Cup, helping EV Zug to a third-place finish in 2004. She also skated for DHC Langenthal and the EHC Wettingen-Baden boys team. In a game versus Russia at the 2012 IIHF Women's World Championship, Marty logged two points (one goal, one assist) in a 5–2 victory, as Switzerland advanced to the semifinals.

NCAA
Marty played alongside her twin sister Stefanie with the New Hampshire Wildcats women's ice hockey program in the 2007–08 season on defense. She scored three goals and added seven assists for 10 points along with a plus-24 rating in 31 games.

For the 2008–09 season, she transferred to the Northeastern Huskies women's ice hockey program in Boston. Marty set career highs for goals, assists, and points in a season despite playing in only 25 games. She finished the season with four goals and thirteen assists. During the 2010–11 season, on 1 October 2010, Marty played in a 4–4 tie vs. Syracuse. The Syracuse team featured her twin sister Stefanie. It was the first time the sisters had ever played against each other in their NCAA careers. On 24 October 2010, she registered her first goal of the season. She also accumulated three assists as Northeastern defeated RPI, 5–1. On 24 October, Marty's four-point performance was the first by a Huskies player since Chelsey Jones recorded five points against the Maine Black Bears on 3 December 2006.

Career stats

Northeastern

Olympics

Awards and honors
2008–09, All-Hockey East Honorable Mention
Hockey East Player of the Week 10 November 2008
Hockey East Player of the Week 25 October 2010
Julia Marty, 2011 Hockey East All-Tournament team

See also
List of Olympic medalist families

References

External links

USCHO bio

1988 births
Living people
Ice hockey players at the 2006 Winter Olympics
Ice hockey players at the 2010 Winter Olympics
Ice hockey players at the 2014 Winter Olympics
Linköping HC Dam players
Medalists at the 2014 Winter Olympics
New Hampshire Wildcats women's ice hockey players
Northeastern Huskies women's ice hockey players
Olympic bronze medalists for Switzerland
Olympic ice hockey players of Switzerland
Olympic medalists in ice hockey
Swiss women's ice hockey defencemen
Swiss twins
Twin sportspeople
Sportspeople from the canton of Schwyz
Swiss expatriate sportspeople in the United States
Swiss expatriate sportspeople in Sweden
Swiss expatriate ice hockey people
Expatriate ice hockey players in the United States
Expatriate ice hockey players in Sweden